Ryan Thomson may refer to:
 Ryan Thomson (footballer, born 1982), Scottish former football player (Hajduk Split, Rot-Weiss Essen)
 Ryan Thomson (footballer, born 1991), Scottish football player (Stranraer)

See also
Ryan Thompson (disambiguation)